Al-Fadhli, Al Fadhli or Alfadhli (from the adjective أفضل (ʾafḍal) = "best", "most outstanding") is an Arabic surname most commonly found in Kuwait and Saudi Arabia . The Arabic definite article Al- distinguishes it from the more numerous Arabic languages surname Fazli.

Notable people with this family name include:
 Abdul Hadi Al-Fadhli (1935–2013), Iraqi Islamic author and thinker
 Ahmad Al Fadhli (born 1982), Kuwaiti footballer
 Khaled Al-Fadhli (born 1974), Kuwaiti footballer
 Saad Kamil Al-Fadhli (born 1963), former Kuwaiti football referee
 Zaher Farid Al-Fadhli (born 1986), Yemeni footballer
 Rakan Jassem Al-Fadhli (born 1998), Kuwaiti Air Force Pilot

Arabic-language surnames